Nancy Nyongesa (born 18 June 1987) is a Kenyan former female volleyball player. She was part of the Kenya women's national volleyball team.

She competed with the national team at the 2004 Summer Olympics in Athens, Greece. She played with Lugulu in 2004.

Clubs
  Lugulu (2004)

References

External links
 
 
 
 
 
 
 
 

1987 births
Living people
Kenyan women's volleyball players
Place of birth missing (living people)
Volleyball players at the 2004 Summer Olympics
Olympic volleyball players of Kenya